Laos participated in the 2014 Asian Beach Games in Phuket, Thailand from 14 to 23 November 2014. Khoun Souksavat clinched Laos' first Asian Beach Games Gold Medal in Shooting Women Petanque.

Laos ended their campaign with 2 gold medals, 2 silver medals, 8 bronze medals and a total of 12 medals, finishing eighteenth on the medal table. The Laos Team achieved its best finish since the start of the Beach Games.

Medal summary

Medal by sport

Medal by Date

External links 
Official Site

References 

Nations at the 2014 Asian Beach Games
2014
Asian Beach Games